Ziya Burhanettin Güvenç is  professor of physics. Güvenç graduated from Department of Physics of Ankara University in 1981 and he finished his master's degree at the Ankara University in 1984, too. He completed his doctorate degree at University of California and he began to work at METU. Güvenç became a professor in 2001.  In 2011, he was elected The rector of the year by Educators Association of Volunteer Organizations of Turkey.

References

External links 
 
 Ziya Burhanettin Güvenç Sanayi Rotası programına konuk oldu 

Living people
Rectors of universities and colleges in Turkey
Turkish physicists
Ankara University alumni
University of California alumni
Year of birth missing (living people)